Badminton competitions at the 2022 South American Games in Asuncion, Paraguay were held between October 2 and 7, 2022 at the Estadio León Condou.

Schedule
The competition schedule is as follows:

Medal summary

Medal table

Medalists

Men

Women

Mixed

Participation
Thirteen nations participated in badminton events of the 2022 South American Games.

References

Badminton
South American Games
2022